When Were We Funniest? is a Gold documentary series broadcast in 2008.

Format
Gold wanted to ask the public which decade of British television they thought was the funniest, the 1960s, 1970s, 1980s, 1990s or 2000s. Before the public voted Gold chose five celebrities who each represented one of the decades of television comedy and all of them attempted to convince the viewing public that their decade was the funniest. The first episode was the celebrities on a panel briefly explaining why they thought the public should vote for their decade.

After that each celebrity presented two episodes. In the first one they were able to explain to the public in more detail why they though their decade was the funniest, they would also show clips from comedy programs in their decade and the celebrity would choose five clips which they believed were the best. Out of all the clips shown, the public were then asked to vote for the five clips they found funniest. In the second episode the clips were put into order based on the public's votes, they were shown from the clip which received the fewest votes to the one with the most votes. The narrator (Alexander Armstrong) would also show where the public placed the celebrity's top five clips. The public were then asked to vote for the funniest decade and funniest clip. In the final overall episode the top five clips were revealed as well as where each decade was placed. As each decade was announced the celebrities gave comments on the placement of each one.

Advocates and result
The presenter and narrator of the program was Alexander Armstrong.

Episodes
The launch episode aired on 28 February 2008, after that each advocate presented their two shows and the series final aired on 18 December 2008.

References

External links
When Were We Funniest on Absolute Radio

2008 British television series debuts
2008 British television series endings
Gold (British TV channel) original programming